Eternal Defiance is the eleventh studio album by the German melodic death metal band Suidakra. It was released in 2013 on AFM Records.

Track listing
 "Storming the Walls" - 03:14.
 "Inner Sanctum" - 05:08.
 "Beneath the Red Eagle" - 04:51.
 "March of Conquest" - 03:47.
 "Pair Dadeni" - 03:49.
 "The Mindsong" - 05:38.
 "Rage for Revenge" - 04:51.
 "Dragon's Head" - 05:24.
 "Defiant Dreams" - 04:26.
 "Damnatio Memoriae" - 04:06.
 "Mrs. McGrath" - 05:14 (Japanese edition bonus track).
 "Beneath the Red Eagle (Orchestral Version)" - 03:22 (Japanese edition bonus track).

Personnel
 Arkadius Antonik - vocals, guitars, banjo, orchestral arrangements.
 Marius Pesch - guitars.
 Tim Siebrecht - bass.
 Lars Wehner - drums.

Additional personnel
 Sebastian Hintz - backing vocals, acoustic guitar.
 Axel Römer - Highland bagpipes.
 Tina Stabel - female vocals, piano.
 Arne Gerits - violin.
 Kris Verwimp - cover art, lyrics, layout.
 Axel Jusseit - photography.
 Martin Buchwalter - producer, mixing, mastering.

External links
 Allmusic

Suidakra albums
2013 albums
AFM Records albums